The Indian Journal of Medical and Paediatric Oncology is a peer-reviewed open-access medical journal published by Medknow Publications on behalf of the Indian Society of Medical and Paediatric Oncology. The journal publishes articles on oncology, pediatric oncology, hemato-oncology, and oncopathology.

Abstracting and indexing 
The journal is indexed in EBSCO, Expanded Academic ASAP, Global Health, Health & Wellness Research Center, Health Reference Center Academic, IndMed, MedInd, PubMed, Scopus, SIIC databases, and Ulrich's Periodicals Directory.

External links 
 

Open access journals
Quarterly journals
English-language journals
Oncology journals
Medknow Publications academic journals
Publications established in 2001
Academic journals associated with learned and professional societies of India